In enzymology, a triokinase is an enzyme that catalyzes the chemical reaction

ATP + D-glyceraldehyde  ADP + D-glyceraldehyde 3-phosphate

Thus, the two substrates of this enzyme are ATP and D-glyceraldehyde, whereas its two products are ADP and D-glyceraldehyde 3-phosphate.

This enzyme belongs to the family of transferases, specifically those transferring phosphorus-containing groups (phosphotransferases) with an alcohol group as acceptor.  The systematic name of this enzyme class is ATP:D-glyceraldehyde 3-phosphotransferase. This enzyme is also called triose kinase.  This enzyme participates in fructose metabolism.

References

 
 

EC 2.7.1
Enzymes of unknown structure